(4:30) Idler is the second album by London-based singer and producer Jamie Isaac. It was released on June 1, 2018, via Marathon Artists.

Track listing

References

2018 albums
Jamie Isaac albums
Marathon Artists albums